The Mount Pleasant Cats were a minor league baseball team that played in the East Texas League from 1923 to 1925. The squad, which was based in the United States city of Mount Pleasant, Texas, featured major leaguers Abe Bowman, Cliff Hill, Gus Mancuso, Randy Moore, Jack Tising, and Max West at different points.

References

1923 establishments in Texas
1925 disestablishments in Texas
Baseball teams established in 1923
Baseball teams disestablished in 1925
Defunct minor league baseball teams
Defunct baseball teams in Texas
Titus County, Texas
East Texas League teams